Dishnicë is a former municipality in the Gjirokastër County, southern Albania. At the 2015 local government reform it became a subdivision of the municipality Këlcyrë. The population at the 2011 census was 1,159. The municipal unit consists of the villages Beduqas, Tolar, Panarit, Riban, Varibop, Kuqar, Mërtinjë, Xhanaj, Bënjë, Fratar, Senican, Katundishtë, Leskovec, Gërdas and Kodrishtë.

References

Former municipalities in Gjirokastër County
Administrative units of Këlcyrë